Sir Charles William Blyth Normand CIE (10 September 1889 – 25 October 1982) was a Scottish meteorologist.

Career
Born in Edinburgh, Normand was educated at the Royal High School and studied mathematics, physics and chemistry at Edinburgh University. In 1913, he was appointed Imperial Meteorologist in India. During the First World War, he served as a meteorological officer with the Indian Army in Mesopotamia. On his return to India he conducted research into atmospheric humidity, and became Director-General of Observatories in India in 1927. He was a member of the Indian Science Congress and a founder of the Indian Academy of Sciences. He was knighted in 1945.

In 1946, Normand moved to Oxford, where he studied atmospheric ozone. He served as Secretary of the International Ozone Commission from 1948 to 1959 and President of the Royal Meteorological Society between 1951 and 1953, receiving their Symons Gold Medal in 1944.

References
Footnotes

Bibliography
C. D. Walshaw, ‘Normand, Sir Charles William Blyth (1889–1982)’, Oxford Dictionary of National Biography. Oxford, Oxford University Press, 2004. Retrieved 5 September 2007.

1889 births
1982 deaths
Alumni of the University of Edinburgh
Companions of the Order of the Indian Empire
Knights Bachelor
People educated at the Royal High School, Edinburgh
Presidents of the Royal Meteorological Society
Scottish meteorologists
Scottish scientists
Scientists from Edinburgh